Winter Break, also released as Snow Job, is a 2003 American comedy-drama film by Marni Banack featuring Milo Ventimiglia and Eddie Kaye Thomas. The film has been described as resembling American Pie, which also features Thomas in a leading role.

References 

2003 films
2003 comedy films